Eurytela dryope, the golden piper, is a butterfly of the family Nymphalidae, found in Sub-Saharan Africa, the Arabian peninsula and Madagascar.

Description
Wingspan: 40–50 mm in males and 45–55 mm in females. The male and female are very similar in appearance. The upperside of the wings is dark brown with a wide, yellow-orange band in the lower two-thirds of the forewing margin and the outer half of the hindwing. The underside of the wings is variegated in shades of brown.

Subspecies
Listed alphabetically:
E. d. angulata Aurivillius, 1898 – eastern and southern Democratic Republic of the Congo, Angola, Uganda, Ethiopia, Kenya, Tanzania, Malawi, Zambia, Mozambique, Zimbabwe, Botswana, Eswatini, South Africa: Limpopo, Mpumalanga, North West, Gauteng, KwaZulu-Natal and Eastern Cape
E. d. brittoni Gabriel, 1954 – south-western Saudi Arabia, Yemen
E. d. dryope (Cramer, [1775]) – Guinea, Sierra Leone, Liberia, Ivory Coast, Ghana, Togo, Benin, southern Nigeria, Cameroon, central and northern Democratic Republic of the Congo
E. d. lineata Aurivillius, 1898 – Madagascar, Comoros

Distribution
E. d. angulata is found in Ethiopia, East Africa, southern DRC, Angola and on the eastern side of South Africa from Limpopo, the Magaliesberg, Mpumalanga, Eswatini, KwaZulu-Natal, to Port St Johns in the Eastern Cape. A photographic record was made further south than Port St Johns during the South African Butterfly Conservation Assessment. E. d. brittoni is found in the south-west of the Arabian peninsula. E. d. dryope from Sierra Leone to Cameroon and northern DRC. E. d. lineata is found in Madagascar.

Life cycle

Eggs
The eggs are covered in longitudinal rows of hairy spines.

Larvae
The larvae are spiny with large head processes and feed on Tragia glabrata, Dalechampia capensis, and Ricinus communis.

Pupae
The pupae are greenish in colour and have greatly expanded wing cases.

Adults
The flight period is year round, peaking between November and June. They have a leisurely, gliding flight, settling frequently, usually with open wings. The adults feed on fermenting fruit, tree sap and nectar. They are found in forests and wooded, frost-free savanna. This species can tolerate drier conditions than the pied piper (Eurytela hiarbas).

Gallery

References

Butterflies described in 1775
Biblidinae
Taxa named by Pieter Cramer